Propst may refer to:

Propst (title), German ecclesiastical title
Propst Airport, private airport in Linn County, Oregon, USA

People
Clyde Propst (died 1959), American college football coach
Jake Propst (1895–1967), American baseball player
Robert Propst (inventor) (1921–2000), American inventor
Robert Bruce Propst (born 1931), American judge
Rush Propst (born 1958), American football coach
Stephen Propst, Architect
Dr. Arthur Propst, Psychiatrist
Dr. Lara Propst (born 1972), Psychiatrist
Dr. Evan Propst (born 1975), Otolaryngologist - Head & Neck Surgeon
Dr. Lisa Propst, Author and Professor of literature
Dr. Alanna Propst, Psychiatrist